Cube houses are a set of innovative houses built in Helmond and Rotterdam in the Netherlands, designed by architect Piet Blom and based on the concept of "living as an urban roof": high density housing with sufficient space on the ground level, since its main purpose is to optimise the space inside. Blom tilted the cube of a conventional house corner upwards, and rested it upon a hexagon-shaped pylon. His design represents a village within a city, where each house represents a tree, and all the houses together, a forest. The central idea of the cube houses around the world is mainly optimizing the space, as a house, to a better distribution of the rooms inside.

Helmond
In 1972 Piet Blom was assigned to fill in an empty site in the city center of Helmond, with a meeting center. Blom proposed a plan that mixed cultural facilities with houses, with a theater amidst 188 house "forest". After the underground parking garage was taken out of the plans, the forest was reduced to 60 houses. But the city council was not convinced. Then Minister Hans Gruijters, born in Helmond, subsidised the building of 3 test houses in the Wilhelminalaan in 1974. The project also received the national status of 'Experimental Housing', which helped to realise Theater 't Speelhuis with a forecourt surrounded by 18 cube houses, at the Piet Blomplein, in 1977. The theatre burned down on December 29, 2011. The two damaged cube houses were restored in 2013/2014.

Rotterdam
The houses in Rotterdam are located on Overblaak Street, right above the Blaak metro station. The 1977 original plan showed 55 houses, but not all of them were built. There are 38 small cubes and two so called 'super-cubes', all attached to each other.

As residents are disturbed so often by curious passers-by, one owner decided to open a "show cube", which is furnished as a normal house, and is making a living out of offering tours to visitors.

The houses contain three floors:
 ground floor entrance
 first floor with living room and open kitchen
 second floor with two bedrooms and bathroom
 top floor which is sometimes used as a small garden

The walls and windows are angled at 54.7 degrees.

In 2006, a museum of chess pieces was opened under the houses.

In 2009, the larger cubes were converted by Personal Architecture into a hostel run by Dutch hostel chain Stayokay.

In 2019, the Art cube opened at Overblaak 30. The Art cube is a place where art and architecture come together. With the original living layout intact, this cube house forms the backdrop for the work of various local artists.

Toronto

In 1996 a cluster of three cubes was built along Eastern Avenue Architect Ben Kutner and partner Jeff Brown were inspired by the original cube houses and had planned to replicate the Rotterdam design on unusable patches of land. However, only three individual houses were built.  In 2018, the land was sold for redevelopment with hopes the structures themselves could be saved and moved elsewhere. In 2021, an application was submitted to the city to redevelop into a "35-storey mixed-use building atop a podium element".

References

External links

Cubic houses Rotterdam
Exterior/interior photos

Buildings and structures in Rotterdam
House styles
Tourist attractions in Rotterdam
Hostels

nl:Kubuswoningen (Rotterdam)